Sada is a municipality of northwestern Spain in the province of A Coruña, in the autonomous community of Galicia. It is situated in the Rías Altas.

References

Municipalities in the Province of A Coruña